, formerly Fukuoka Sanix Blues and Fukuoka Sanix Bombs,  was a Japanese rugby union team based in Munakata, Fukuoka Prefecture, Japan. Founded in April 1994 (Heisei 6), the team rose rapidly through the Kyūshū leagues and was in the Top League for the first season (2003-4) as Kyūshū's sole representative, but lost a relegation battle with Kintetsu Liners 42-45 and was demoted. But Sanix managed to return to the Top League for the 2005-6 season, beating Secom Rugguts and Toyota Jido Shokki in the Top League Challenge Series 2005.

In March 2022, Sanix Inc., the operators of the club, announced the disbandment of the team following the conclusion of the 2022 Japan Rugby League One season.

Current squad

The Munakata Sanix Blues squad for the 2022 season was:

Former players
Graeme Bachop
Jamie Joseph
John Leslie
Matua Parkinson - blindside flanker
Bad Luck Fale
Damian Karauna - utility backuben Parkinson]] - centre
Jacques Potgieter - flank

Home ground

 Global Arena (The Sanix company is involved in the running of the Global Arena in  Munakata, which is also the venue for the annual Sanix World Rugby Youth Tournament held in May between eight top Japanese and eight top foreign high school teams from various countries.)
 Sanix Genkai Ground, Kamiminato, Munakata, Fukuoka.

Mascot

The former mascot's name was Bombee. He was a cartoon-style dog with floppy ears who wore the Sanix rugby kit and a scrum cap. He was no longer used when the team name changed from Bombs to Blues.

See also
Top League Challenge series
Sanix World Rugby Youth Invitational Tournament

References

External links
Official website
The Team

Defunct rugby union teams in Japan
Japan Rugby League One teams
Rugby in Kyushu
Rugby clubs established in 1994
Sports clubs disestablished in 2022
Sports teams in Fukuoka Prefecture
1994 establishments in Japan
2022 disestablishments in Japan